Espionage in Lisbon (also known as Mission Lisbon) is a 1965 Spanish-Italian-French Eurospy film directed by Federico Aicardi  and Tulio Demicheli. It is an unofficial entry in the Secret Agent 077 film series. It starred Brett Halsey, Marilu Tolo and Fernando Rey. Horror film icon Jesus Franco wrote the original story which the film is based on, and worked on the music score as well.

Cast
Brett Halsey	... 	George Farrell, agent 077
Marilù Tolo	... 	Terry Brown, 077's partner
Fernando Rey	... 	Agent of the New World Organization
Jeanne Valérie	... 	Olga
Alfredo Mayo	... 	Losky
Daniel Ceccaldi	... 	Robert Scott
Francesca Rosano
Irán Eory	... 	Moira
Barbara Nelli	... 	Pamela
Erika Blanc	... 	Ragazza in bikini (as Erica Bianchi)
Ángel Terrón
Rafael Bardem

References

External links
 

1965 films
1960s spy thriller films
1960s Spanish-language films
1960s action films
French spy thriller films
Spanish spy thriller films
Italian spy thriller films
1960s Spanish films
1960s Italian films
1960s French films